Frontier is a 1968 UK television series that was made for Thames Television. Set in India's northwest frontier during the Victorian era, the series was written by Anthony Skene. At the time of its premiere, it was the most expensive television series made in the United Kingdom. Produced by Michael Chapman and directed by Dennis Vance, the series ran for only one season with a total of 8 episodes from Jul 31, 1968 through September 18, 1968. Many of the scenes were filmed at the Royal Military Academy Sandhurst. Most editions of this series are considered lost.

Main Cast
Gary Bond as Lt. Clive Russell
 Paul Eddington as Hamilton Lovelace
 James Maxwell as Captain Stoughton
 Patrick O'Connell as Colour Sgt. O'Brien
 John Phillips as Lt-Col. Whitley

References

External links
Frontier at IMDB
1960s British drama television series